174 (one hundred [and] seventy-four) is the natural number following 173 and preceding 175.

In mathematics
There are 174 7-crossing semi-meanders, ways of arranging a semi-infinite curve in the plane so that it crosses a straight line seven times. There are 174 invertible  (0,1)-matrices. There are also 174 combinatorially distinct ways of subdividing a topological cuboid into a mesh of tetrahedra, without adding extra vertices, although not all can be represented geometrically by flat-sided polyhedra.

The Mordell curve  has rank three, and 174 is the smallest positive integer for which  has this rank. The corresponding number for curves  is 113.

In other fields
In English draughts or checkers, a common variation is the "three-move restriction", in which the first three moves by both players are chosen at random. There are 174 different choices for these moves, although some systems for choosing these moves further restrict them to a subset that is believed to lead to an even position.

See also
 The year AD 174 or 174 BC
 List of highways numbered 174

References 

Integers